The Only Good Punk...Is A Dead One is the debut album proper by British crust punk band Electro Hippies.  The original LP featured 20 songs, all but four of which last less than two minutes. The 2002 re-issue of the album (with the title shortened to The Only Good Punk) contains an additional 20 tracks (the listing can be found at the allmusic review); of those, six were taken from a compilation album and fourteen were from a live recording done in 1989.

Track listing
All Songs Written By Electro Hippies.

Personnel
Andy: Guitars, Vocals
Dom: Bass, Vocals
Simon: Drums

Production
Produced By Electro Hippies & Hammy
Engineered & Mixed By Disk Drive

References

External links
"The Only Good Punk...Is A Dead One" at discogs: link

1988 debut albums
Electro Hippies albums